Kenneth Alexander Taylor (29 September 1916 – 5 April 2002) was an English cricketer active from 1946 to 1949 who played for Warwickshire. He was born in Muswell Hill, Middlesex and died in Nottingham. He appeared in 87 first-class matches as a righthanded batsman who bowled right arm medium pace. He scored 3,145 runs with a highest score of 102 and took one wickets with a best performance of one for 18.

Notes

1916 births
2002 deaths
English cricketers
Warwickshire cricketers